The International Series is a series of men's professional golf tournaments played internationally, as part of the Asian Tour.

History
The series was unveiled in February 2022. The investment was backed by LIV Golf.

The first event was played in March 2022 with the International Series Thailand. American Sihwan Kim won his first Asian Tour event shooting 26-under-par, beating Phachara Khongwatmai by two shots.

The next event was played at Slaley Hall in Northumberland, England. This was the first Asian Tour event to be staged in the United Kingdom. The original date of the event was rescheduled a week earlier due to the first event of the LIV Golf Invitational Series being scheduled to take place on the same week at the Centurion Club. Scott Vincent won the event, claiming his first Asian Tour victory and becoming the first Zimbabwean to win on the Asian Tour.

Following the International Series England, the Asian Tour announced the next two events as part of the International Series. They were to take place in Singapore and South Korea, played in back-to-back weeks in August 2022.

After the conclusion of the International Series Korea in August 2022, the Asian Tour again added two more International Series events to their schedule. They were to be played in Morocco and Egypt, in back-to-back weeks in November. On 28 September 2022, it was announced that the BNI Indonesian Masters had been added to the tour schedule as an International Series event.

Scott Vincent won the inaugural International Series Order of Merit, gaining a place in the 2023 LIV Golf League.

Order of Merit winners

2022 season

Schedule

Order of Merit
The Order of Merit was based on prize money won during the season, calculated in U.S. dollars. The leading player earned status to play in the 2023 LIV Golf League.

2023 season

Schedule

References

External links
Asian Tour

Golf tournaments in Thailand
Golf tournaments in England
Golf tournaments in Singapore
Golf tournaments in South Korea
Asian Tour events